The  was one of the armaments expansion plan of the Imperial Japanese Navy (IJN).

Background
In August 1941, the IJN started building warships for war. It extended to 293 vessels, 300,000 tons.

Table of vessels

See also
1st Naval Armaments Supplement Programme (Maru 1 Keikaku, 1931)
2nd Naval Armaments Supplement Programme (Maru 2 Keikaku, 1934)
3rd Naval Armaments Supplement Programme (Maru 3 Keikaku, 1937)
4th Naval Armaments Supplement Programme (Maru 4 Keikaku, 1939)
Temporal Naval Armaments Supplement Programme (Maru Rin Keikaku, 1940)
Additional Naval Armaments Supplement Programme (Maru Tui Keikaku, 1941)
5th Naval Armaments Supplement Programme (Maru 5 Keikaku, 1941)
6th Naval Armaments Supplement Programme (Maru 6 Keikaku, 1942)
Modified 5th Naval Armaments Supplement Programme (Kai-Maru 5 Keikaku, 1942)
Wartime Naval Armaments Supplement Programme (Maru Sen Keikaku, 1944)

References
Rekishi Gunzō series, Gakken (Japan)
The Maru Special series, Ushio Shobō
Daiji Katagiri, Ship Name Chronicles of the Imperial Japanese Navy Combined Fleet, Kōjinsha (Japan), June 1988, 
大日本帝国海軍艦艇一覧 (ja)

Naval Armaments Supplement Programme
Naval Armaments Supplement Programme